Tërbuf is a village and a former municipality in Fier County, western Albania.  At the 2015 local government reform it became a subdivision of the municipality Divjakë.

Population
The population at the 2011 census was 10,201.

References

Former municipalities in Fier County
Administrative units of Divjakë
Villages in Fier County